Aiken is an unincorporated community in Shelby County, Texas. It is home to the Excelsior Independent School District. As of 2000, the population is 75.

History 
Aiken had a sawmill, a blacksmith,  a school, 2 churches, a cotton gin, and a store in 1890s, but the post office closed in 1909 and only the school and churches remained.

Education 
Aiken is served by the Excelsior Independent School District.

References

Unincorporated communities in Shelby County, Texas